Mecas bicallosa is a species of longhorned beetle found in North and Central America. It was described by Martin in 1924.

References

Saperdini
Beetles described in 1924